The Zimin Opera was founded by the Russian entrepreneur Sergei Zimin in Moscow, Russia in 1903.

The company staged the premieres of such operas as Rimsky-Korsakov's Golden Cockerel, Gretchaninoff's Beatris Sister and Ippolitov-Ivanov's Izmena. It also staged the Russian premieres of Puccini's La fanciulla del West, Wagner's Die Meistersinger von Nürnberg, Mascagni's Iris and Leoncavallo's Zazà.

Many well-known Russian and Italian opera singers performed with the company, including Georges Baklanoff, Lina Cavalieri, Feodor Chaliapin, Leonid Sobinov, Valeria Barsova and Titta Ruffo.

Stage sets and costumes were designed by such Russian artists as Ivan Bilibin, Viktor Vasnetsov and Nicholas Roerich.

During its fourteen-year history, Zimin Opera staged more than 120 operas.

The company closed in May 1917.

References

Music in Moscow
Theatres in Moscow
Musical groups established in 1903
1917 disestablishments in Russia
Russian opera companies
1903 establishments in the Russian Empire
Musical groups disestablished in 1917